Sarmad Sehbai (born 1945 in Lahore) is a Pakistani poet, playwright, film and theatre director, worked in Urdu, Punjabi and English languages.

Early life and education
Sarmad Sehbai was born in Lahore, Punjab, British India in 1945. He studied at Government College Lahore, where he was known for his Urdu poetry.

Career
Sarmad first made his career breakthrough in 1968 by getting a job with PTV as a scripts producer. Then Sarmad Sehbai appeared on the Pakistani literary scene as a poet and made his theatre debut in the early 1970s.
His poetry collection includes Neeli Kay Su Rung, Un Kahi Baton Ki Thakan, Mulaqat, Raja ka Beya. He adapted Manto's Naya Qanoon and Toba Tek Singh for Pakistan Television. He wrote theater play The Dark Room, two Punjabi-language plays Panjawan Chiragh,  Auss Gali Na Jaween and a documentary Mughals of the Road.

His movie as a writer was Mah e Mir (2016 film) which was a 2016 Pakistan nomination in the foreign language Academy Awards in the United States.

Sarmad Sehbai also wrote a TV play Mor Mahal (2016 TV serial) released by Geo TV and nationally aired on Pakistani television in 2016. This TV drama serial portrays the pre-colonial era in old India and is directed by Sarmad Khoosat. Play's name translates in English as Peacock Palace.

Actor Manzar Sehbai is his brother.

Awards and recognition
 Pride of Performance Award for Literature by the President of Pakistan in 2021.

References

External links

Living people
1945 births
Government College University, Lahore alumni
Pakistani dramatists and playwrights
Pakistani television writers
Recipients of the Pride of Performance